Charles "Chuck" Wilson Jr. (born April 23, 1968) is an American multimedia executive. He is currently the CEO of Triumph Media Holdings, a multimedia company. He is also the founder of Babygrande Records. Wilson has served as the executive producer on over 100 titles. In addition, he was the director of A&R at Priority Records as well as director of business affairs at Black Entertainment Television ("BET"). He also conceived and co-wrote the 2004 film Soul Plane.

Career

Film 
Wilson broke into the film industry as an intern for Spike Lee on the set of 1994's Crooklyn.
Wilson sold his first script to Danny DeVito in 1999. The film was about wealthy African Americans in the Hamptons, which Wilson said was akin to "a black Great Gatsby". The same year, Wu-Tang International optioned his music-based urban drama Trife Life and Jersey Films purchased his untitled urban comedy pitch, centered on golf. Trife Life was set to star Mos Def, but never came to fruition. He went on to write and direct the short film, Breakfast At Ben's which was also a part of his deal with Wu-Tang International. Wilson was granted rare access to shoot the film in the historic Washington, D.C. restaurant Ben's Chili Bowl where his father used to take him to eat as a child. Breakfast At Ben's appeared on Warner Brothers's compilation, Afrocentricity and premiered at the 2000 Urbanworld Film Festival. It also appeared in the DC Independent Film Festival as well as the Maryland Film Festival. Wilson went on to co-write the film, Soul Plane which was described by Variety magazine as a next generation Airplane!. Soul Plane came under fire from several members of the black community including Spike Lee who accused the film of being exploitative of African Americans.
In 2004, he was slated to write "a black wedding comedy" titled, Meet The Mo'Fockers, parodying such films as Meet The Parents and The Wedding Singer. The film was part of a deal with Maverick Films company, then owned by Madonna. Despite its comedic nature, the film was also set to examine class differences within the black community.
Wilson has also collaborated with RZA on a screenplay entitle "Black Shampoo" based on the Wu-Tang Clan leader's alter-ego, Bobby Digital.

Music 
During his tenure at Priority Records, Wilson worked extensively on several projects, including the Training Day original soundtrack which he A&R'd. In 2001, Wilson left his position as Director of A&R at Priority Records to found the independent label, Babygrande Records. Wilson said, "Early on, when I saw the whole consolidation trend starting to occur with major labels, I decided to branch out and start a small indie label". Babygrande was initially funded by the money Wilson made from selling his scripts to Hollywood and operated from Wilson's apartment. The label has released over two hundred titles, including albums from M.O.P., GZA of Wu-Tang Clan, U-God of Wu-Tang Clan, Raekwon The Chef of Wu-Tang Clan, Brand Nubian, Grand Puba, Jedi Mind Tricks, Army Of The Pharaohs, Canibus, Hi-Tek and Sa-Ra, among others.

In 2004, SOHH recognized Wilson as a "player to watch". He was also named one of Billboard Magazine's 2005 Power Players. He has also been cited as an authority on piracy by Billboard Magazine.

Television 
Wilson served as Director of Business Affairs at Black Entertainment Television. Among other initiatives, Wilson assisted with the company's launch of its first made for television feature film division, BET Pictures and the production of its initial ten "Arabesque Films". The original slate of ten films was historic in that they represented the largest single slate of African-American themed films ever produced.

New Media 

In 2006, Wilson and several other partners formed Triumph Media Holdings, Inc which launched the first Hip-Hop social media network, Crackspace. The press dubbed the website, "A Myspace/YouTube for hip-hop". In 2008, the site re-launched under the name iHipHop.

Personal life
Wilson graduated from the University of Virginia, earning a Bachelor of Arts from the School of Architecture in 1990. He continued his graduate studies at The University of Virginia and went on to earn a Juris Doctor from the University of Virginia School of Law and a Masters of Business Administration from the Darden Graduate School of Business Administration (JD/MBA) in 1994. As an undergraduate at the University of Virginia, Wilson was President of the university's NAACP chapter, and was selected to live in Thomas Jefferson's Academic Village also known as The Lawn which is among the highest student honors at the university. Wilson has been a member of the Kappa Alpha Psi fraternity since 1987. He also studied film at New York University's Tisch School of the Arts.

In 2005, he married Jenise Campbell. He currently splits his time between Manhattan, New York City and Beverly Hills, California. He has two sons that attend The Collegiate School and IMG Golf Academy.

References

External links

1968 births
Living people
Tisch School of the Arts alumni
University of Virginia School of Architecture alumni
University of Virginia Darden School of Business alumni
University of Virginia School of Law alumni